Ebuleodes is a genus of moths of the family Crambidae. It contains only one species, Ebuleodes simplex, which is found in India (Khasia Hills).

References

Spilomelinae
Taxa named by William Warren (entomologist)
Crambidae genera
Monotypic moth genera